Bad Boys is the fifth and final studio album released by R&B group DeBarge in 1987, after both El DeBarge and Bunny DeBarge had left the lineup.

When El and Bunny DeBarge left the group, remaining members James, Mark and Randy left Motown Records after a seven-year tenure in 1986 and signed with the local Striped Horse label. They then called on eldest brother Bobby (formerly of the group Switch) to join the lineup and produce their album.

With James and Bobby DeBarge now alternating as the lead vocalists, the group released the album in 1987 and released two singles: "Dance All Night", which became the group's last R&B hit, peaking at number 33, and the ballad "I Got You Babe", which fizzled at number 73. The group would later appear on the Punky Brewster show with brother Chico tagging along (Chico, then having a hit with "Talk to Me", opened for his brothers during a tour).

Because of limited promotion from the little label and no other attention brought into the El-less lineup, the album fizzled, and after Bobby and Chico were arrested for drug possession (eventually serving six years in prison), the remaining trio disbanded altogether in 1989.

Track listing
"Dance All Night" (Ralph Benatar, Hazel P. Payne, Lorenzo Pryor, Galen Senogles) - 3:41
"We're Havin' Fun" (Alvin Allen, Bobby DeBarge, James DeBarge, Mark DeBarge, Randy DeBarge) - 3:33
"You're a Big Boy" (Alvin Allen, James DeBarge) - 4:31
"You're Not the Only One" (Richard Gibbs, Eric Williams) - 3:10
"All Over" (James DeBarge) - 4:25
"Say You Do" (James DeBarge, Randy DeBarge) - 4:25
"I Got You Babe" (Bobby DeBarge) - 4:38
"Take It to the Top" (Mark DeBarge, Lorenzo Pryor) - 3:18
"Every Time I Think of You" (James DeBarge) - 4:29

Personnel 
DeBarge
 Bobby DeBarge – keyboards, lead and backing vocals, arrangements (2, 3, 5-9)
 James DeBarge – keyboards, lead and backing vocals, arrangements (2, 3, 5-9)
 Mark DeBarge – backing vocals, arrangements (2, 3, 5-9)
 Randy DeBarge – backing vocals, arrangements (2, 3, 5-9)

Additional Musicians
 Richard Gibbs – keyboards, synthesizers, programming, arrangements (1, 4, 6)
 Randy Kerber – keyboards 
 Lorenzo Pryor – keyboards
 Ralph Benatar – programming
 Roland Bautista – guitars 
 Paul Jackson Jr. – guitars
 Eric Williams – guitars 
 Leon Gaer – bass 
 Kerry Hatch – bass
 Jimmy Johnson – bass
 Louis Johnson – bass
 Michael Jochum – drums 
 Pete Escovedo – percussion 
 Doug Norwine – saxophone solo (5)
 Judd Miller – trumpet solo (9)

Production 
 DeBarge – producers
 Carlo Nasi – producer 
 Richard Gibbs – co-producer
 Ralph Benatar – co-producer (1)
 Galen Senogles – co-producer (1), engineer 
 Gabe Veltri – engineer, mixing 
 John X. Volaitis – engineer 
 Ken Adessi – assistant engineer 
 Judy Clapp – assistant engineer 
 Peter Doell – assistant engineer 
 Stephen Kraue – assistant engineer
 Troy Mathisen – assistant engineer 
 Saul Raye – assistant engineer 
 Will Rogers – assistant engineer 
 Bill Giolando – editing 
 Wally Traugott – mastering 
 George Osaki – art direction
 Stephen Harvey – photography 
 Chaz Atkins – design
 James Walker – design

Studios
 Recorded at Avatar Studios (Malibu, CA); Ground Control Studios and Image Recording Studios (Los Angeles, CA); Capitol Studios and Fiddler Studios (Hollywood, CA); Sheika Studios (North Hollywood, CA).
 Mixed at Capitol Studios
 Mastered at CMS Digital (Pasadena, CA).

1987 albums
DeBarge albums